Radiance of Shadows is the eighth full-length by Canadian drone doom band Nadja, released on October 8, 2007 by Alien8 Recordings.

Track listing

Personnel
Aidan Baker – guitar, vocals, piano, woodwinds, drums
Leah Buckareff – bass guitar, vocals

External links
Alien8 page about the album

Nadja (band) albums
2007 albums
Alien8 Recordings albums